Mullagulovo (Mullağol) is a rural locality (a village) in Aptrakovsky Selsoviet, Meleuzovsky District, Bashkortostan, Russia. The population was 155 as of 2010. There are 2 streets.

Geography 
Mullagulovo is located 27 km southeast of Meleuz (the district's administrative centre) by road. Aptrakovo is the nearest rural locality.

References 

Rural localities in Meleuzovsky District